Paul Graham Luty (5 May 1932 – 12 January 1985) was an English wrestler who later became a film and television actor.

In 1973 Luty played window cleaner, Bert Henshaw on Coronation Street.  Other television credits include Love Thy Neighbour (as Nobby Garside), A Sharp Intake of Breath, Emmerdale (Sid Pickles), Rosie (Chief Inspector Dunwoody), In Loving Memory (Tom Wrigley) and Porridge (Chalky).

Film credits

Notes

External links
 
 Wrestling Furnace.com whos who/ Paul Luty

1932 births
1985 deaths
English male professional wrestlers
Male actors from Yorkshire
English male film actors
English male television actors
20th-century English male actors
Sportspeople from Yorkshire